Nothomastix klossi is a moth in the family Crambidae. It was described by Rothschild in 1915. It is found in Papua New Guinea.

References

Moths described in 1915
Spilomelinae
Moths of New Guinea